The study of the role of women in particular in the society of Anglo-Saxon England has been a topic of academic research in history and gender studies since the 1980s. A seminal study was published by  Christine Fell as Women in Anglo-Saxon England in 1984. According to Fell, women were "near equal companions to the males in their lives, such as husbands and brothers, much more than in any other era before modern time". Despite this sense of equality in some strata of society, Anglo Saxon women were still subject to concubinage.
Gender was influenced by social status, religion and sexuality.
They were not only allowed to have private influence, but also a wide liberty of intervention in public affairs.

Occupations 
Women and children were generally involved in tasks that required little physical work. Though, due to climate and weather constraints, women may have done the work that needed attention at the time.
 While men were ox-herders, labourers, swine-herders, and so forth, women were cheese-makers and dairy-maids. They were also bakers, though not cooks. In Old English the word for cook is coc, and is only found in the masculine form, while baecere and bascestre respectively represent the feminine and masculine forms of baker. Female slaves were corn-grinders, serving maids, wet-nurses, weavers, and seamstresses. Common free women may have been found spinning as well as weaving. Women and ladies, including queens, would serve drinks for company and family. This was not only a job for a woman of lower-class, though it would have likely been done by a low-class woman if one were present. Women of this time were also entertainers, comedians, and singers, and may have been employed by households or travelling groups.

Christianity 
Churches in Anglo-Saxon England stressed doctrines that preached about virginity as a virtue and faithful monogamy; this is believed to have limited an individual’s chances of acquiring status, political power and property. Anglo-Saxon England was one of the first places in history where women were raised to sainthood, and this was most keenly observed immediately following the acceptance of Christianity. Christianity provided certain level of freedom for women and helped them rise to some of the most powerful positions in society. Within the church, women received relatively equal status despite there being evidence of anti-feminism found in homilies. Although anti-feminism was found in homilies, it does not always hold true in practice. Women who went into the convent and took vows of poverty, chastity and obedience were glorified in the eyes of the Church and its Fathers. The convent offered self-development and social responsibility to women, something that women are still fighting for today. Uniquely, the Anglo-Saxon church had institutions that consisted of male and female monasteries, located together but segregated. In these, the female abbot assumed the headship of the institution. Convents were run by abbesses, this is evidence that women held positions of visibility and significance. They were responsible for the finances and management of property, with help from some of the resident nuns. This level of authority did not survive the Viking invasion of 789, although women continued to play a major role in the church in late Anglo-Saxon England. The presence of single gendered convents and monasteries meant chores that were commonly done by the other sex, would have been performed by the common sex. For example, men would have worked in the kitchens of monasteries and women would have worked in the gardens of nunneries.

It is clear that there were equal opportunities for men and women in the Christian Church in Anglo-Saxon England, but it is still important to look at the "Patriarchs of the Bible." Although women were given these opportunities, they were given by men and the Church's significant positions of authority were all held by men. Thus the gender differences and ideological conflicts surrounding sexuality and kinship, amongst others, resulted from the introduction of Christianity.

Marriage and divorce 
In Anglo-Saxon England, there were many laws related to marriage. Some historians profess that the law that neither widow, nor maiden was forced to marry a man that she disliked as being a sign of equality; however, Aethelberht's law contradicts this in as much as a man is legally allowed to steal another man's wife as long as he pays him reparation. Once married, a woman was to situate herself as the object of her husband's subjectivity, she was to become the object of his protection and the property, although she still remained the owner of her property. The Church held that married women had no authority and were to stand under the lordship of men. Therefore, under the church they were not able to teach, witness, take an oath, nor be a judge. In marriage, a male often developed his sphere of influence through his wife. Although women were seen as such under the church, there were laws that protected them in the public sphere when married. Divorce was rare, and the only documented ones were in cases of adultery. A woman who committed adultery by sleeping with a man who was not her husband while her husband was still alive was subject to give what she owned to her husband. Æthelraed's 1008 code states that widows shall remain unmarried for 12 months after the death of her husband, at which point they have the freedom to choose. This was likely the case to allow for the widows to have time to think and not make any rash decisions which may have led to relationships or commitments.

A prospective husband had to offer his wife a valuable gift called the morgengifu, a “morning-gift,” which consisted of paying money or giving land for the ladies’ hand in marriage. This was paid to her directly and she had the right to do with it as she pleased. It is made clear that the marriage finances were held by both man and woman. A woman was free to leave a marriage, keeping in mind the only times divorce was documented was in cases of adultery; and if the woman did leave and take the children, she was entitled to half the property. These gifts were substantial sums and generally property. The gifts given by the groom were sometimes viewed as a sale of the bride, when, in actuality, it was to safeguard her interests and add security.

Sexual mores 
According to the church sexual desires were evil and sinful, thus appeared as so; therefore women were not to enjoy sex. Many times sex was not gentle, because it was not meant to please the woman. When it came to paying for sex with a woman belonging to the King she would have cost roughly 30 shillings, while a commoner only 6 shillings. The transfer of money for sex shows that there was prostitution, although it is not clearly stated whether the women condoned the act or not, and this issue is still up for debate; what is known is that there was a sex trade in some form. The fact that rape of a slave was more expensive than seduction of a free woman shows how rape was viewed so negatively in society, although the law protected women against both actions. Laws of Ælfred go into great detail regarding laws about sexual assaults. An example of the law committed by a man was King Æthebald of Mercia who was punished for numerous reasons, including violating holy nuns who were virgins consecrated to God. When compensation was paid a free woman, ceorl or ranked above, she collected the money directly, and the money for slaves went to their owner. It is also unclear as to whether the wife or husband received the money for their servants. Rape as a topic is important because it relates to gender relations, class status, property rights, judicial customs, female agency, religious virtues of integrity of the body and representation of all of these in a society. Sexual assaults were greatly penalized whether it was a slave or free woman. Burials suggest that a raped body was unceremonious. A few documents suggest that some men of this era applauded other men who beat their wives and that some men even thought that a wife should be beaten regularly; this may have been condoned by clergy. Even though there were laws protecting women that had been raped, sometimes the acts went unpunished for lack of information or time. The victim herself may not have told  anyone until many years after, or no one really took an interest in the crime if the victim was of the serving class.

Sex and rape were also found in literature. There are executed and threatened acts of violent sexual assaults mentioned in some literature and legal texts; an example is the homily of Wulfstan, a text in which he wrote about women being raped at the hands of the Vikings.

Laws 
The written law only represents a portion of the laws that impacted the lives of women; therefore they only reflect partial views of what actually happened. Despite what the churches doctrines taught, women were considered to be a member of the state and their rights were protected, regardless of their status as maiden, widow or wife. Women were classed as oath worthy and could appear as grantors, grantees and witnesses of charters. Women were held responsible and accountable under the law for their activity, although were not held accountable for any criminal activity that her husband did, unless she was a willing accessory to the crime. Along with being law abiding, they received appropriate compensation for crimes that were committed against them, and the compensation was paid directly to them.

Wills
Women had property rights and many landowners were women. They were able to bequeath land, as shown in numerous wills. Leaving property by means of a will was not restricted to kin; it could also be left to servants, religious figures, and churches. Documents of wills and charters show that women owned estates, by virtue of grant, will, or inheritance, and that they were seen roughly equal in the common life of the countryside. Evidence in these documents shows no preference to daughters or sons as heirs. Ceorl women and others of high rank were responsible for their homes. Some of the items that women would commonly receive via trust or inheritance were real property estates, slaves, livestock, household furnishings, clothing, jewels, and books. Items such as table clothes, bed sheets, and wall hangings were considered women's property because women made them.

Health 
Anglo-Saxons had warnings for pregnant women, including avoiding foods that were too salty or sweet, pork, and other fatty foods. They were also told to abstain from strong alcohol and too much drink and to avoid travel on horseback. If a woman were to stop menstruating supposedly due to a lack of nutrients and was not pregnant, she was to take hot baths, drink hot herb teas, and dress warmly.

See also
List of Wessex consorts

Notes

References 

  
  
  
  
  
  
  
  
  
  
  
  
  

Women in England
Anglo-Saxon society
Anglo-Saxon